Bijaya Kumar Gachhadar (born February 1, 1954) is a Nepalese politician and leader of the Nepali Congress. He has served five terms as deputy prime minister of Nepal under the government of Madhav Kumar Nepal, Baburam Bhattarai, KP Sharma Oli, Pushpa Kamal Dahal and Sher Bahadur Deuba. He was the second vice-president of Nepali Congress.

Political career 
In April 2008, he won the Constituent Assembly election, 2013 with 23769 votes. Gachhadar was previously in the Madhesi people forum and Nepali Congress (Democratic), and was Minister of Water Resources. Gachhadar was formally expelled from Nepali Congress in March 2008, by that time he had already joined PRF. He was subsequently appointed as Minister and sworn in on 22 August 2008.

On 4 June 2009 he was appointed as the deputy prime minister for the first time keeping in consideration his contribution to establish Madhav Kumar Nepal's administration.

Again as per the poll in the cabinet, he was again appointed as the Deputy Prime minister and Minister of Home Affair in the government led by Prime Minister Baburam Bhattarai. On 16 Oct 2017 his party Nepal Democratic Forum merged with Nepali Congress. He was nominated Vice-president of Nepali Congress alongside Bimalendra Nidhi till 2021.

He was suspended from member of parliament on 5 February 2020 due to corruption charges.

Electoral history

Election in the 2010s

2017 legislative elections

2013 Constituent Assembly election

Election in the 2000s

2008 Constituent Assembly election

Election in the 1990s

1999 legislative elections

1994 legislative elections

1991 legislative elections

See also 
Kamal Thapa
Bimalendra Nidhi
Prakash Man Singh
Gopal Man Shrestha
Upendra Yadav
Ram Chandra Poudel
Jitendra Narayan Dev

References

Living people
Nepali Congress politicians from Koshi Province
Nepali Congress (Democratic) politicians
Government ministers of Nepal
Madhesi Jana Adhikar Forum, Nepal politicians
Madhesi people
People from Sunsari District
Deputy Prime Ministers of Nepal
Nepal MPs 2017–2022
Nepal MPs 1991–1994
Nepal MPs 1994–1999
Nepal MPs 1999–2002
1954 births
Members of the 1st Nepalese Constituent Assembly
Members of the 2nd Nepalese Constituent Assembly